Richard Wattis (25 February 1912 – 1 February 1975) was an English actor, co-starring in many popular British comedies of the 1950s and 1960s.

Early life
Richard Cameron Wattis was born on 25 February 1912 in Wednesbury, Staffordshire, the elder of two sons born to Cameron Tom Wattis and Margaret Janet, née Preston. He attended King Edward's School and Bromsgrove School, after which he worked for the electrical engineering firm William Sanders & Co (Wednesbury) Ltd. His uncle, William Preston (1874–1941), was the managing director and was the Conservative MP for Walsall from 1924 to 1929.

Career
After leaving the family business, Wattis became an actor. His debut was with Croydon Repertory Theatre, and he made many stage appearances in the West End in London. His first appearance in a film was A Yank at Oxford (1938).

War service interrupted his career as an actor. He served as a second lieutenant in the Small Arms Section of Special Operations Executive at Station VI during the Second World War (James Bond author, Ian Fleming worked in the same section).

Wattis is best known for his appearances, wearing his thick-rimmed round spectacles, in British comedies of the 1950s and 1960s, often as a "Man from the Ministry" or similar character. Such appearances included the St Trinian's films (The Belles of St. Trinian's, Blue Murder at St Trinian's, and The Great St Trinian's Train Robbery) as Manton Bassett, a civil servant who was the Deputy Director of Schools in the Ministry of Education, where he was often seen frowning and expressing indignation at the outrageous behaviour of other characters. To American audiences, Wattis is probably best known for his performance as the British civil servant Northbrook in The Prince and the Showgirl (1957). He broke from this typecasting in his later films, such as his starring role in Games That Lovers Play.

Wattis's other films included Hobson's Choice, The Inn of the Sixth Happiness, Chitty Chitty Bang Bang, Carry On Spying, The Colditz Story, Dentist on the Job, Very Important Person, The Happiest Days of Your Life, and The Longest Day.Operation Crossbow as Sir Charles Sims. He also appeared on television, including a long-running role in Sykes and as a storyteller on the BBC children's programme Jackanory, narrating in 14 episodes between 1971 and 1972. Other television credits include appearances in Danger Man, The Prisoner, The Goodies, Hancock's Half Hour, and Father, Dear Father. From 1957 to 1958, he appeared as Peter Jamison in three episodes of the American sitcom Dick and the Duchess.

Personal life and death 
On 1 February 1975, Wattis suffered a heart attack while dining at Berwick's Restaurant in Walton Street, London. He was taken to hospital, but was dead on arrival. He was 62 years old. A memorial service was held for him at St Paul's, Covent Garden, the "Actor's Church", and a plaque near his grave.

In 1999, twenty-four years after Wattis’ death, Dan Rebellato claimed Wattis was gay in an era when this was a taboo subject, and when homosexual acts were criminal offences in the UK.

In fiction
Wattis was played by Richard Clifford in the 2011 film My Week with Marilyn, which depicts the making of the 1957 film The Prince and the Showgirl.

Selected filmography

 A Yank at Oxford (1938) as Latin Speaker at Dinner (uncredited)
 Marry Me! (1949) as Minor Role (uncredited)
 Kind Hearts and Coronets (1949) as Defence Counsel (uncredited)
 Helter Skelter (1949) as Compere of Nick Nack show (uncredited)
 The Chiltern Hundreds (1949) as Vicar (uncredited)
 Your Witness (1950) as Minor Role (uncredited)
 The Happiest Days of Your Life (1950) as Arnold Billings
 The Clouded Yellow (1950) as Employment Agent
 The Lavender Hill Mob (1951) as Opposition MP (uncredited)
 Appointment with Venus (1951) as Carruthers – Higher Executive
 Lady Godiva Rides Again (1951) as Otto Mann (casting director)
 The Happy Family (1952) as M.P.
 Song of Paris (1952) as Carter
 Stolen Face (1952) as Mr. Wentworth, Store Manager
 The Importance of Being Earnest (1952) as Seton
 Derby Day (1952) as Editor (uncredited)
 Mother Riley Meets the Vampire (1952) as P.C. Freddie
 Penny Princess (1952) as Hotel Desk Clerk (uncredited)
 Made in Heaven (1952) as The Vicar, Hayworth Honeycroft
 Top Secret (1952) as Barnes
 Top of the Form (1953) as Willoughby-Gore
 Appointment in London (1953) as Pascal
 Innocents in Paris (1953) as Secretary
 Colonel March Investigates (1953) as Cabot
 The Final Test (1953) as Cricket Fan in the Stand. (uncredited)
 Park Plaza 605 (1953) as Theodore Feather
 Blood Orange (1953) as Detective Inspector MacLeod
 The Intruder (1953) as School Master
 Background (1953) as David Wallace
 Small Town Story (1953) as Marsh (uncredited)
 Doctor in the House (1954) as Medical Book Salesman (uncredited)
 Hobson's Choice (1954) as Albert Prosser
 The Belles of St. Trinian's (1954) as Manton Bassett
 The Crowded Day (1954) as Mr. Christopher
 Lease of Life (1954) as The Solicitor
 The Colditz Story (1955) as Richard Gordon
 As Long as They're Happy (1955) as Theatre Stage Manager (uncredited)
 See How They Run (1955) as Rev. Lionel Toop
 I Am a Camera (1955) as Bespectacled Man at Book Launch (uncredited)
 Escapade (1955) as Peace committee member (uncredited)
 Simon and Laura (1955) as Controller of Television Drama ('CT')
 An Alligator Named Daisy (1955) as Hoskins
 The Time of His Life (1955) as John Edgar
 A Yank in Ermine (1955) as Boone
 Jumping for Joy (1956) as Carruthers
 The Man Who Never Was (1956) as Shop Assistant
 The Man Who Knew Too Much (1956) as Assistant Manager
 The Iron Petticoat (1956) as Lingerie Clerk
 Eyewitness (1956) as Anesthetist
 It's a Wonderful World (1956) as Harold
 The Green Man (1956) as Doctor
 A Touch of the Sun (1956) as Purchase
 Death in the Dressing Room (1956 episode of Colonel March of Scotland Yard) as D. W. Cabot
 The Silken Affair (1956  as Worthington
 Around the World in 80 Days (1956) as Inspector Hunter of Scotland Yard (uncredited)
 The Little Hut (1957) as Official
 Second Fiddle (1957) as Bill Turner
 The Prince and the Showgirl (1957) as Northbrook
 The Abominable Snowman (1957) as Peter Fox
 High Flight (1957) as Chauffeur Wilson
 Barnacle Bill (1957) as Registrar of Shipping
 Blue Murder at St Trinian's (1957) as Manton Bassett
 The Inn of the Sixth Happiness (1958) as Mr. Murfin
 The Captain's Table (1959) as Prittlewell
 Ten Seconds to Hell (1959) as Major Haven
 Left Right and Centre (1959) as Harding-Pratt
 The Ugly Duckling (1959) as Barclay
 Libel (1959) as The Judge
 Follow a Star (1959) as Dr. Chatterway
 Your Money or Your Wife (1960) as Hubert Fry
 Follow That Horse! (1960) as Hugh Porlock
 Very Important Person (1961) as Woodcock, Entertainments Officer
 Nearly a Nasty Accident (1961) as Wagstaffe
 Dentist on the Job (1961) as Macreedy
 Play It Cool (1962) as Nervous Man
 Bon Voyage! (1962) as Party guest
 I Thank a Fool (1962) as Ebblington
 The Longest Day (1962) as British Paratrooper
 Venus fra Vestø (1962) as Englænder
 Come Fly with Me (1963) as Oliver Garson
 The V.I.P.s (1963) as Sanders
 Carry On Spying (1964) as Cobley
 The Amorous Adventures of Moll Flanders (1965) as Jeweler
 Operation Crossbow (1965) as Sir Charles Sims
 The Battle of the Villa Fiorita (1965) as Travel Agent
 The Alphabet Murders (1965) as Wolf
 You Must Be Joking! (1965) as Parkins
 Bunny Lake Is Missing (1965) as Clerk in Shipping Office
 The Liquidator (1965) as Flying Instructor
 Up Jumped a Swagman (1965) as Lever, Music Publisher
 The Great St Trinian's Train Robbery (1966) as Manton Bassett
 Casino Royale (1967) as British Army Officer
 Wonderwall (1968) as Perkins
 Chitty Chitty Bang Bang (1968) as Secretary at Sweet Factory (uncredited)
 Monte Carlo or Bust! (1969) as Golf Club Secretary
 Tam-Lin (1970) as Elroy
 Games That Lovers Play (1971) as Mr. Lothran
 Sex and the Other Woman (1972) as Presenter
 That's Your Funeral (1972) as Simmonds
 Diamonds on Wheels (1974) as Sir Hilary Stanton
 Take Me High (1974) as Sir Charles Furness
 Confessions of a Window Cleaner (1974) as Carole's Father

References

External links

 

1912 births
1975 deaths
British Army personnel of World War II
English male film actors
English male television actors
People educated at Bromsgrove School
People educated at King Edward's School, Birmingham
People from Wednesbury
Royal Army Medical Corps officers
British Special Operations Executive personnel
20th-century English male actors
British male comedy actors
English gay actors
20th-century English LGBT people